Joris Ahlinvi (born 13 July 1995) is a French professional footballer who plays as a winger for Virton in the Belgian Division 2.

Club career

Valenciennes, Montpellier & Lége-Cap-Ferret
Ahlinvi played with the Valenciennes  academy and their second team in the CFA. Following Valenciennes relegation in Ligue 2, he chose to joined Montpellier in June 2014. He later joined CFA 2 side US Lège-Cap-Ferret, where he scored 6 goals in 16 appearances.

College in the United States
In 2016, Ahlinvi made the move to the United States to play college soccer at Florida International University, where he played for 3 seasons, scoring 16 goals and tallying 9 assists in 47 appearances. During his time at FIU, Ahlinvi was named C-USA All-Tournament Team, C-USA All-Freshman Team,  All-AAC Second Team, All C-USA First Team and USC All-Southeast Region First Team.

Ahlinvi transferred to Indiana University for his senior year in 2019. He scored 2 goals in 10 appearances for the Hoosiers and was named USC East Region First Team and All-AAC First Team.

Reading United
While at college, Ahlinvi made a single appearances for USL PDL side Reading United during their 2017 season.

2020 MLS SuperDraft
On 13 January 2020, Ahlinvi was selected 53rd overall in the 2020 MLS SuperDraft by FC Cincinnati.

New Mexico United
On 13 February 2020, Ahlinvi signed for USL Championship side New Mexico United.

Virton
On 6 August 2021, Ahlinvi signed with Belgian Division 2 side Virton.

International career
Born in France, Ahlinvi is of Beninese descent. He was named on the bench for the Benin national team during an international fixture against Equatorial Guinea on 14 June 2015.

Personal life
Joris is the brother of professional footballer of Mattéo Ahlinvi, who plays for Nîmes Olympique.

Career statistics

References

External links

Joris Ahlinvi profile at FIU
Joris Ahlinvi profile at Indiana

1995 births
Living people
French sportspeople of Beninese descent
French footballers
French expatriate footballers
French expatriate sportspeople in the United States
Expatriate soccer players in the United States
Association football midfielders
Valenciennes FC players
Montpellier HSC players
US Lège Cap Ferret players
FIU Panthers men's soccer players
Indiana Hoosiers men's soccer players
Reading United A.C. players
New Mexico United players
FC Cincinnati draft picks
Championnat National 2 players
Championnat National 3 players
USL League Two players
R.E. Virton players
French expatriate sportspeople in Belgium
Expatriate footballers in Belgium
Black French sportspeople